The following are the football (soccer) events of the year 1941 throughout the world.

Events

January 19 – FK Austria Wien defeat LASK Linz 21–0 in the Gauliga Ostmark (Austrian First Division).
June 24 – The USSR First Division championship is abandoned after the German invasion of the USSR.
Alajuelense win the Costa Rican First Division with a 100% record – played 6, won 6, drew 0, lost 0.
Nacional win the Uruguayan First Division with a 100% record – played 20, won 20, drew 0, lost 0.
Two matches are not played in the final round of the Chilean First Division. They are Colo-Colo versus Badminton FC, and Unión Española versus Green Cross.

Winners club national championship 
 Argentina: River Plate
 Austria (Gauliga Ostmark) and Germany: Rapid Vienna 
 Chile: Colo-Colo
 Costa Rica: Alajuelense
 Croatia: Hajduk Split
 Iceland: KR
 Italy: Bologna
 Mexico: Atlante
 Scotland:
Scottish Cup: No competition
 Spain: Atlético Aviación (Atlético Madrid in Post-War)
 Switzerland: Lugano
 Romania: Unirea Tricolor București
 Turkey: Gençlerbirliği
 Uruguay: Nacional

Births 
 January 11 
 Gérson, Brazilian international footballer
 Pak Seung-zin, North Korean footballer (died 2011)
 January 20 – Allan Young, English club footballer (died 2009)
 January 28 – Fernando Serena, Spanish footballer (d. 2018)
 February 1 – Teofil Codreanu, Romanian international footballer (died 2016)
 March 2 – Bert Jacobs, Dutch footballer and manager (died 1999)
 April 12 – Bobby Moore, English international footballer. England captain and World cup winner (died 1993)
 May 21 – Anton Pronk, Dutch international footballer (died 2016)
 June 2 – Dinko Dermendzhiev, Bulgarian footballer and manager (died 2019)
 July 8 – Dario Gradi, Italian amateur football player, coach and manager known for his association with English club Crewe Alexandra
 July 10 – Henk Bosveld, Dutch footballer (died 1998)
 July 22 – Harry Bähre, German footballer
 July 26 – Hans Dorjee, Dutch footballer and manager (died 2002)
 August 2 – Jean Cornelis, Belgian international footballer (died 2016)
 August 20 – Marian Szeja, Polish international footballer (died 2015)
 August 24 – Jean Plaskie, Belgian international footballer (died 2017)
 September 15 – Flórián Albert, Hungarian international footballer (died 2011)
 October 9 – Giancarlo Bercellino, Italian international footballer
 October 28 – David Sloan, Northern Irish international footballer (died 2016)
 November 23 – Alan Mullery, English international footballer and manager

References

 
Association football by year